Andrew I may refer to:

 Andrew I of Hungary ( 1015 – before 1060)
 Andrew, Archbishop of Antivari (14th century)
 Andrei of Polotsk ( 1325–1399)
 King Andrew the First, American political cartoon

Andrew 01